A Hand in the Bush: The Fine Art of Vaginal Fisting is a 1997 book by Deborah Addington about the sexual practice of inserting a fist into a vagina. It reached number four on Amazon's "Hot 100" sales chart in February 2000.

References

1998 non-fiction books
Sex manuals